"Made-Up Lovesong #43" is a song by Guillemots, from their album, Through the Windowpane. It was released as a single; their first to be chart-eligible, reaching number 23 in the UK Singles Chart. An older version of the song appears on I Saw Such Things in My Sleep EP and From the Cliffs.

Track listing
CD single
"Made-Up Lovesong #43"
"Woody Brown River" (demo)
"The Dormouse & The Meerkat"
"Made-Up Lovesong #43" (Video)

7-inch Picture Disc
"Made-Up Lovesong #43"
"Parafuso"
"Atina"

7-inch single
"Made-Up Lovesong #43"
"Dunes "

References

2006 singles
Guillemots (band) songs
2006 songs
Polydor Records singles